Konrad Ludwig Georg Baring (8 March 1773, Hannover – 27 February 1848, Wiesbaden, during a spa treatment) was an officer in the army of the Electorate of Hanover and the British army's King's German Legion. Some sources also give his name as Baron Georg(e) von Baring.

Life

To 1815
Baring's military career began with his joining the Hanoverian army in 1787. In November 1803 (dating the commission to 17 November) he became a brevet major in the King's Germans (renamed the King's German Legion on 19 December 1803), a force of which he had been one of the first members. He fought in the campaigns in Hannover (1805, Third Coalition), the Baltic (1807–08, Gunboat War / English Wars), the Pyrenees (1808–13, Peninsular War), the Walcheren Campaign (1809, Fifth Coalition), southern France (1813–14, Sixth Coalition) and the Netherlands (1814, Sixth Coalition). On 16 May 1811 he was slightly wounded at the battle of Albuera. On 18 June 1815 he was promoted to lieutenant colonel.

Waterloo 

At the head of the 2nd Light Infantry Battalion of the Legion, Baring was put in charge of the defence of the farmhouse of La Haye Sainte during the battle of Waterloo on 18 June 1815. He wrote about the events of the day in a detailed report, which ended with the words:

After Waterloo 
The King's German Legion was dissolved after Waterloo and Baring joined the newly formed army of the Kingdom of Hanover, in which he became oberst in the Garde-Grenadier-Regiment (26 December 1828) and from 1830 as Flügel-Adjutant in the general staff. In 1831, the year in which his Erzählung der Teilnahme des 2. Leichten Bataillons der Kgl. Deutschen Legion an der Schlacht von Waterloo (History of the Participation of the 2nd Light Infantry Battalion of the King's German Legion at the Battle of Waterloo) was published in a Hanoverian military journal, he held the rank of Brigade-Kommandeur. On 18 June 1832, the seventeenth anniversary of Waterloo, he and his descendants were made Freiherrs by William IV (then still king of Hanover) in recognition of his war service and made Hanover's city commander. In 1834 he rose to Generalmajor then in 1846 to Generalleutnant.

Memorials
A street in Hanover city-centre is named after him and a small memorial stone is dedicated in front of the Hauptstaatsarchiv Hannover near the present-day regional parliament and the former royal palace.

Honours 

 United Kingdom
 CB – Knight Companion of the Order of the Bath
 Waterloo Medal
 Kingdom of Hannover
 Royal Guelphic Order, 2nd class
 King William Cross
 Kingdom of the Netherlands
 Military William Order, 3rd class

References

Bibliography 
 N. Ludlow Beamish; History of the King's German Legion Vol. 2. 1832-37 (new edition: Naval and Military Press 1997 )
 Mike Chappell; The King's German Legion (2) 1812-1816. Osprey 2000 
 Peter Hofschröer; The Waterloo Campaign – The German Victory. Greenhill Books London (1999) 
 Friedrich Lindau, Erinnerungen eines Soldaten aus den Feldzügen der Königlich – deutschen Legion: Ein Bürger Hamelns erzählt aus der Zeit 1806 bis 1815. AUREL Verlag, Daun 2006  
 Jens Mastnak: Diese denckwürdige und mörderische Schlacht – Die Hannoveraner bei Waterloo, Celle 2003 
 Klaus Mlynek in Hannoversches Biographisches Lexikon. Von den Anfängen bis in die Gegenwart. Hannover: Schlüter 2002, S. 39f. 
 Bernhard Schwertfeger; Geschichte der Königlich Deutschen Legion 1803-1816 2. Band. Hahn‘sche Buchhandlung 1907
 Staats- und Adelskalender für das Königreich Hannover auf das Jahr 1830

External links 

King‘s German Legion – full report on Baring's defence of La Haye Sainte

1773 births
1848 deaths
German commanders of the Napoleonic Wars
King's German Legion